Denys Molchanov and Andrey Rublev defeated Raven Klaasen and Ben McLachlan in the final, 4–6, 7–5, [10–7] to win the doubles tennis title at the 2022 Open 13 Provence. Rublev completed a double crown, having won the singles title earlier in the day.

Lloyd Glasspool and Harri Heliövaara were the defending champions but chose to play in Delray Beach instead.

Seeds

Draw

Draw

References

External links
 Main draw

Open 13 Provence - Doubles
2022 Doubles
2022 in French sport